The Jeffery armored car was an armored car developed by the US and Canada. It saw heavy use in World War I.

Armored Car No. 1
The Jeffery Armored Car No.1 was developed by the Thomas B. Jeffery Company in Kenosha, Wisconsin in 1915 with a hull from the Rock Island Arsenal

The armored car No.1 was used in General John Pershing’s 1916 Pancho Villa Expedition in Columbus, New Mexico for training. Pancho Villa was far into Mexico at that time and there are no records on its use in fighting.

Jeffery-Russel armored cars

The Russel company in Canada built a number of armored cars on the four-wheel drive Jeffery chassis. After serving in Canada for a while they were sent to the UK. From there they were sent on to British India. Forty were added to the "Field Force" that was operating to contain the Mohmand rising of Haji Mullah on the North West Frontier. The "Mohmand blockade" involved British armored cars patrolling unpaved tracks between blockhouses. Maintenance of the cars was difficult as the ship carrying spares had been torpedoed. They were armed with a single Vickers machine gun. Although the four-wheel drive with independent transmission and wide range of gears should have been an advantage, the narrow solid tires negated that and running at more than  caused problems with engine bearings.

Jeffery-Poplavko
A different model of armored car basing on the Jeffery Quad chassis was built in Russia by Ukrainian officer Victor Poplavko who was the Odessa city commandant (1917–18), and was known as Jeffery-Poplavko.

Gallery

References

External links
 Eaton Machinegun Battery with image
 Jeffery No.1 warwheels.net

Armoured cars of the United States
World War I armoured cars
Kenosha, Wisconsin
Military vehicles introduced in the 1910s